Juice Magazine, founded in 1993 in Wilmington, North Carolina, is a skateboarding, surfing and music publication, edited, owned and published by Terri Craft. It includes interviews by skate editor, Jim Murphy, and features editors: Steve Olson, Jay Adams, Dave Duncan, Christian Hosoi, Jim O'Mahoney, and surf editors Jeff Ho, Herbie Fletcher and Dibi Fletcher. The staff includes Terri Craft, editor and Dan Levy, assistant editor.  Other interviewers include Jason Jessee, Jeff Ament, Chuck Dukowski, Bill Danforth and Chris Mearkle.  There are currently 76 issues of the magazine. Juice Magazine headquarters is located in the birthplace of modern-day skateboarding, Venice, California.

Interviews
The magazine interviews skateboarders, surfers, and musicians.  Some of the interviewees include:
Skateboarders:
Andy Kessler "I don’t know of anywhere else in the world that has the same surroundings and energy as New York City. Sometimes ripping through the streets is the best thing you can do on your skateboard."
Arto Saari
Chad Muska
Chris Haslam (skateboarder)
Curren Caples
Daewon Song
Darren Navarette
Duane Peters
Greyson Fletcher
Jake Brown (skateboarder)
Jake Duncombe
Jason Jessee
John Cardiel
Kevin Kowalski
Natas Kaupas
Omar Hassan (skateboarder)
Pat Duffy
Rick McCrank
Steve Caballero
Tony Hawk

Musicians:
Bebe Buell
Bootsy Collins
Cheetah Chrome
Cherie Currie
Chuck Dukowski
Exene Cervenka
Glen Matlock
James Hetfield
Jeff Ament
Jello Biafra
Keith Morris
King Diamond
Phil Alvin
Robert Trujillo
Ron Emory
Suzi Quatro
Tony James
Wayne Kramer (guitarist)

Surfers:
Danny Fuller (surfer)
Laird Hamilton
LeRoy Grannis
Makua Rothman
Peter Mel
Sunny Garcia

Artists:
C. R. Stecyk, III
Dante Ross
Legs McNeil
Scott Caan
Seymour Duncan

Special Features
Alva Collection: Interviews with the Alva Skateboarding Team
Bones Brigade Chronicles: Interviews with the Bones Brigade
Dogtown Chronicles: Interviews with the Z-Boys
Duty Now For The Future: Interviews with Skatepark Builders

Dogtown Chronicles
Dogtown Chronicles features interviews with the Z-Boys, Zephyr skateboarding team Dogtown and Z-Boys including:
Jeff Ho Surfboards and Zephyr Productions
C. R. Stecyk, III
Skip Engblom
Tony Alva
Jay Adams
Stacy Peralta
Peggy Oki
Bob Biniak
Wes Humpston
Chris Cahill
Allen Sarlo
Nathan Pratt
Shogo Kubo
Paul Constantineu
Wentzle Ruml IV
Glen E Friedman

References

Bibliography
Newman, M. (1996) 'Continental Drift', Billboard, Cincinnati.

External links
 

Music magazines published in the United States
Magazines established in 1993
Magazines published in California
Magazines published in North Carolina
Skateboarding magazines
Surfing magazines